The Bura Gauranga River and sea channel are located in the Patuakhali district of Barisal Division in Bangladesh.

References

See also
List of rivers in Bangladesh

Rivers of Bangladesh
Rivers of Barisal Division